Peter Pearson may refer to:

 Pete Pearson (1877–1929), Australian born elephant hunter and game ranger in East Africa
 Peter Pearson (director) (born 1938), Canadian film director and screenwriter
 Peter Pearson (British Army officer) (born 1954), former British Army officer
 Peter Pearson (painter, born 1955), Irish artist, author, historian, and conservationist
 Peter Pearson (painter) (born 1957), American icon painter, author and teacher
 Peter Pearson (footballer) (born 1995), Saint Lucian footballer
 Peter Pearson (tennis) (born 1955), American tennis player